Donald Stephen Lowell Cardwell (4 August 1919 – 8 May 1998) was a historian of science and technology, Professor of the History of Science at UMIST from 1974 to 1984 and President of the Manchester Literary and Philosophical Society.

Career 
Cardwell was born in Gibraltar in 1919 and was the son of a civil servant from Croydon, Surrey. He was educated at Plymouth College and gained a First-Class degree in Physics at King's College London in 1939. During the Second World War, he joined the Admiralty Signals Establishment, serving in Scotland, West Africa and the Middle East. Post-war he returned to King's College London to study for a PhD in Physics working with Bill Seeds, John Randall and Maurice Wilkins.

He worked at Keele University for two years c.1955 with the economist Bruce Williams, then at the University of Leeds before joining UMIST as Reader in the History of Science and Technology (1963) and later Professor (1974) before his retirement in 1984.

He was involved in laying the groundwork for the creation of Manchester’s Museum of Science and Industry (opened in 1969), and was also President of the Manchester Literary and Philosophical Society (1991–93). The Society held a Memorial Lecture in his honour in 1999.

Personal life 
Cardwell married Olive Pumphrey in 1953. They had one son, one daughter, and one son who predeceased him.

Select bibliography 

 The Organisation of Science in England (1957).
 John Dalton and the Progress of Science (1968).
 Turning Points in Western Technology: A Study of Technology, Science, and History (1972)
 Artisan to Graduate (1974).
 James Joule: a biography (1989).
 The Fontana History of Technology (1994).

References 

1919 births
1998 deaths
Gibraltarians
Historians of science
Alumni of King's College London
Academics of Keele University
Academics of the University of Leeds
Academics of the University of Manchester Institute of Science and Technology
Manchester Literary and Philosophical Society
20th-century British historians
20th-century English historians